Sue Cobb could refer to: 

Sue M. Cobb (born 1937), American politician and diplomat
Sue Bell Cobb (born 1956), American jurist